= Norman Cherkavsky =

Ukrainian musician (1982–2016)

Norman "DJ Norman" Cherkavsky
- Born: December 23, 1982; Kyiv, Ukraine
- Died: September 15, 2016 (aged 33); Kyiv, Ukraine
- Occupation: Musician
- Musical career
- Also known as: DJ Norman
- Genres: Electro-classical
- Instrument: Synthesizer
- Years active: 2015–2016

Norman Cherkavsky, known as DJ Norman (December 23, 1982 – September 15, 2016) was a Ukrainian musician. His music was inspired by Kraftwerk. His last known song was "World War II". He won the "New Electro Award" as a starting musician.

== Studio albums ==
Year	Title	Notes
2016	Roment	Date: January 1, 2016

== Singles ==
Year	Title	Notes
2015	Elementary School	Date: May 19, 2015
2015	Shit	Date: May 20, 2015
